Chesapeake is an independent city in the Commonwealth of Virginia, United States.

Chesapeake has a population of 249,422 (as per the 2020 census). It is located at latitude 37.308 and longitude -75.952.

|title=Chesapeake - Local Area Photos and Information |website=VA Home Town Locator}}</ref>

References
https://www.cityofchesapeake.net/1685/History-of-Chesapeake

Unincorporated communities in Virginia